Thoma Bravo, LP, is an American private equity and growth capital firm with offices in San Francisco, Chicago and Miami. It is known for being particularly active in acquiring software companies and has over $120 billion in assets under management. It is the successor to the firm Golder Thoma & Co., which was established in 1980 by Stanley Golder and Carl Thoma. Thoma Bravo is led by managing partners Seth Boro, Orlando Bravo, Scott Crabill, Lee Mitchell, Holden Spaht and Carl Thoma.

In 2021 it was the highest growing major buyout firm in the world. In February 2019, the French business school HEC Paris, in conjunction with Dow Jones, named Thoma Bravo, the best-performing buyout investor after studying 898 funds raised between 2005 and 2014. The company focuses on the application, infrastructure and cybersecurity software and technology-enabled business service sectors, and uses a "consolidation" or "buy and build" investment strategy.

Investments 
Called by the Financial Times, "one of the most active acquirers of software companies in the world", it has done over 300 software deals since 2003 and oversees a portfolio of over 40 software companies.

According to public data analyzed by Forbes, its funds returned 30% net annually. Since 2015, Thoma Bravo has sold or listed 25 investments worth $20 billion, four times their cost.

Software investments 
Thoma Cressey Equity Partners began investing in the enterprise software sector in 2002 with the acquisition of Prophet21, a provider of software for durable goods distributors.

In 2014, the company acquired Riverbed Technology for $3.6 billion. Riverbed later filed for Chapter 11 Bankruptcy in December 2021.

After the purchase of edtech company Instructure in 2020, the purchase was accused of being "rushed" and "riddled by conflicts of interest" by a large shareholder at the time.

In March 2022, Thoma Bravo acquired the enterprise cloud software company, Anaplan for $10.7 billion (€9.6bn). The acquisition completed in June 2022 following Thoma Bravo cutting the takeover offer down to $10.4 billion after alleging that the company had violated the acquisition terms by overpaying new hires.

In December 2022, the company outbid Vista Equity Partners to announce its acquisition of Coupa Software for $6.15 billion in cash, and a total enterprise value of $8 billion.

Security investments 
In March 2020, Thoma Bravo completed its $3.9 billion acquisition of Sophos.

In 2022, Thoma Bravo made a series of security related investments. In April, it announced acquisition of identity security company, SailPoint for $6.9 billion with financing from private lenders. SailPoint specializes in providing secure access to remote work software and cloud infrastructure protection. In August, it agreed to buy Ping Identity for $2.8 billion in an all-cash transaction. In October, it agreed to buy ForgeRock for $2.3 billion in an all-cash deal.

In April 2022, Thoma Bravo divested of its companies, the cloud-first security solutions provider, Barracuda Networks to KKR for an undisclosed sum.

Fintech investments 
In May 2022, Thoma Bravo acquired Bottomline Technologies for $2.6 billion in an all-cash transaction.

History

In 1980 Stanley Golder and Carl Thoma established Golder Thoma & Co, a company that has been credited as creating the “consolidation” or “buy and build” investment strategy. In 1984, Bryan Cressey was recruited to join the firm from First Chicago, and the firm's name was changed to Golder Thoma Cressey. With the promotion of Bruce Rauner to partner, it became Golder, Thoma, Cressey, Rauner, Inc. (GTCR).

In 1998, the firm split into two firms: GTCR Golder Rauner, for raising larger funds and pursuing larger investments; and Thoma Cressey Equity Partners, which continued the firm's longstanding focus on the "middle market".

In 2008, Thoma Cressey Bravo became Thoma Bravo after Bryan Cressey left the company to establish a separate healthcare services fund, Cressey & Co.

The firm closed its 12th fund in September 2016, with $7.6 billion. Thoma Bravo raised $12.6 billion for its 13th fund, which was announced in January 2019.

In October 2019, Thoma Bravo’s co-founder and managing partner, Orlando Bravo, was named the first Puerto Rican-born billionaire as he debuted at 287th place on the Forbes 400 ranking of the wealthiest Americans.

The company moved its operations to Miami, Florida at the end of 2020.

In December 2021, it was reported that Thoma Bravo had taken more multi-billion dollar public companies private in the past year than any other buyout firm. At the same time, company executives sought to raise $35 billion for more acquisitions.

See also 
 Carl and Marilynn Thoma Art Foundation

References

External links
 

Financial services companies established in 2008
Private equity firms of the United States
American companies established in 2008
Companies based in Chicago